Body, Mind, Soul is the fourth studio album by American singer-songwriter Debbie Gibson, released on January 19, 1993, by Atlantic Records. The album failed to find favor with the record buying public and missed out on the U.S. top 100, peaking at No. 109, and also in the UK when it was released a few months later. However, the album was a hit in Japan, peaking at No. 13 on the charts. It was Gibson's last studio album under Atlantic Records.

The album was included in the 2017 box set We Could Be Together, with two B-sides and three remixes as bonus tracks. A special two-disc digipack edition was released by Cherry Red Records on November 18, 2022.

Track listing

 "Shock Your Mama" was omitted from the South Korea release due to music censorship laws.

Charts and certifications

Weekly charts

Personnel
Musicians
Debbie Gibson – lead and backing vocals, keyboards 
Carl Sturken – keyboards, guitars, drums, "The Guys" on track 1 (tracks 1–5, 11)
Eric Rehl – keyboards, drums (tracks 6, 10)
Elliott Wolff – tracks (tracks 7–9)
Alan Ferrante – guitar (tracks 7–8)
Ira Siegel – guitar (track 10)
John "Noodle" Nevin – bass guitar (tracks 4, 11)
Bashiri Johnson – percussion (tracks 1–9)
Sammy Figueroa – percussion (track 10)
Andy Snitzel – saxophone (track 6)
Dave Koz – saxophone (tracks 8–9)
Evan Rogers – backing vocals "The Guys" on track 1 (tracks 1–5, 11)
Darroll Gustamachio – "The Guys" (track 1)
David Kutch – "The Guys" (track 1)
Kevin Wright – backing vocals (tracks 4, 11)
Robin Clark – backing vocals (track 6)
Michelle Cobbs – backing vocals (track 6)
Diva Gray – backing vocals (tracks 6, 10)
Jill Dell'Anzte – backing vocals (track 10)
Vaneese Thomas – backing vocals (track 10)

Production
Debbie Gibson – arranger
Carl Sturken – arranger (tracks 1–5, 11)
Evan Rogers – arranger (tracks 1–5, 11)
Eric Rehl – arranger (tracks 6, 10)
Elliott Wolff – arranger (7–9)
Phil Ramone – arranger (track 10)
Darroll Gustamachio – engineer, mixing (Visual Sound Design, Inc.) (tracks 1–6, 10–11)
Fred Guarino – engineer (tracks 6–10)
David Kutch – engineer, assistant engineer, mix engineer
Spyros Poulos – additional programming engineer (tracks 7–9)
Steve Peck – mixing (tracks 7–9)
Jennifer Bette – additional mix engineer (tracks 7–9)
Richard Travali – additional recording (tracks 4, 7–9)
Mark Gaide – additional recording (track 10)
Thomas Bricker – art direction
Dah Len Wee – photography
Diane Gibson – Management (GMI)
Herb "Pump" Powers – mastering (The Hit Factory DMS)

References

External links
 
 
 

1993 albums
Debbie Gibson albums
Atlantic Records albums
Albums produced by Carl Sturken and Evan Rogers
Albums produced by Phil Ramone